Bangabandhu Sheikh Mujibur Rahman Agricultural University (BSMRAU) is a public agricultural university in Bangladesh, established in 1998. It was the first Center of Excellence Graduate Agricultural Institute in Bangladesh emphasizing research and extension. It is located at South Salna, in Gazipur District.

According to the Scimago Institute Rankings, 2021 report, Bangabandhu Sheikh Mujibur Rahman Agricultural University (Bashemurkribi) has been ranked first (first place) in these three indices of research, innovation and social position among the public and private universities of the country by international standards.

History
BSMRAU was established on 22 November 1998. The university is named after the father of the nation Bangabandhu Sheikh Mujibur Rahman. Previously, it was established as Institute of Post Graduate Studies in Agriculture (IPSA). Japan International Cooperation Agency (JICA) remarkably contributed to establish Institute of Post Graduate Studies in Agriculture (IPSA) through its Grant Aid and Technical Cooperation projects since 1978 as a "Center of Excellence" for agricultural education and research in Bangladesh. 1983, IPSA was originally established as the Bangladesh College of Agricultural Sciences (BCAS). It was an academic part of Bangladesh Agricultural Research Institute (BARI) and associated academically with Bangladesh Agricultural University. IPSA was transformed in an autonomous institution by the government of Bangladesh and started course credit based MS and Ph.D. programs in 1991. The graduate program of IPSA was developed by the teachers of IPSA led by L. M. Eisgruver of Oregon State University (OSU).

In 1998, IPSA transformed into BSMRAU. As a public university, it continued the post-graduate program and launched an undergraduate program. In 2005, BSMRAU started to offer a Bachelor of Science degree in Agriculture [BS (Agriculture)].

In 2008, BSMRAU established its Faculty of Fisheries and started to offer a BS degree in Fisheries. The Faculty of Veterinary Medicine and Animal Sciences was established in 2009 and started to offer the Doctor of Veterinary Medicine (DVM) degree. After 3 years, in 2012, BSMRAU established the Faculty of Agricultural Economics and Rural Development and started offering a BS in Agricultural Economics. Now, BSMRAU has five faculties. and one Institute Institute of Biotechnology and Genetic Engineering (IBGE), while a Faculty of Forest and Environment is under the process of establishment. Another two institutes namely, Institute of Climate Change (ICC) and Institute of Food Safety and Processing (IFSP) are under the process of operation.

List of vice-chancellors 
 Prof. Giashuddin Miah ( present )

Campus

Located in a rural setting in between Joydebpur Chowrasta and National Park of Rajendrapur, surrounded by the Sal forest of the Madhupur Tract and characterized by the topographical diversity with undulated land.

The university has a regular bus service from campus to Dhaka (Farmgate) twice a day including Friday also. And campus to Joydepur in nears to 2 hours interval. According to BSMRAU, it offers a unique, calm and quiet campus; most suitable for academic pursuit.

Infrastructure

 Administrative Building
 5 Faculty Buildings
 4 Students Dormitory (2 for Male and 2 for Female students)
 Residential Facilities for Teachers, Officers, and Employees
 Kbd. Dr. Kazi M. Badruddoza Outreach Center
 Dr. M. Wazed Mia Central Laboratory
 Technology Exhibition Center
 Prof. Dr. Yoshio Yamada Library and AV Room
 Ex-situ Gene Bank/ Eco Park
 Central Mosque
 Begum Sufiya Kamal Auditorium (Accommodation of Around 1,000 seats)
 Conference Room
 Research Field
 Digital Herbarium and Herbal museum for Crop Plant
 Lake View Study Park 
 Modern TSC
 Cafetoria
 Canteen
 Health Centre
 International Complex
 Shaheed Minar (Monument)
 Sports Ground
 BSMRAU Sub-postoffice
 Gymnasium
 Guest House
 Sonali Bank Branch and DBBL Fast Track with ATM Booth
 BSMRAU School
 Nursery/Children Park
 BECS Supershop
 Ansar Camp
 Veterinary Clinic
 International Complex

Academics

English is the medium of instruction at BSMRAU. The study at BSMRAU comprises Term based Course Credit System, which the students can understand going through the following points thoroughly:
 The Course Credit System: The course credit system involves course work with regular classes, assignments, unannounced quizzes, and pre-scheduled 2 midterms and final examinations. In this system, subject matter is taught in modules (courses) of reasonably homogenous subject matter, The students will receive "Grades" for each of the courses taken to indicate the extent of his/her mastery of the subject matter taught in each respective course.
 Term: An academic year is divided into three terms – Summer, Autumn and Winter. Each term consists of 12 (twelve) effective weeks.
 Credit: One class hour in a week during a term shall be considered as one credit. For laboratory classes, two class hours shall be considered as one credit.
 Course: A course is a set of topics delivered to the students by lectures, contact hours and practical exercises on a specific subject incorporated in the approved curricular layout and developed by the Board of Studies (BOS) to offer in a term.
 Course Coding: Each course is designated by 3 (three) capital letters and a 3-digit number. The 3 letters indicate the department offering the course. Of the three digits, the first digit indicates the academic year in which the course is normally offered. The next two digits indicate the offering term, where 01-30 stand for the First term, 31-60 for the Second term, and 61-99 for the third term.

Research and publications 
The university has been conducting researches from its inception shouldering active roles in the national and international agricultural research arena. Teaching excellence and effective research are conclusively interrelated in academics and that of innovation in programs. Classrooms teaching are continually powered and enriched by those faculty members who are actively engaged in research. Faculty members of this university have many long and short-term research projects and these projects are prepared as per national agricultural research needs and implemented. Some of the faculty members also prepare and implement research projects in collaboration with national and international research scientists. In many cases, the postgraduate student research is linked with the research projects of the faculty members. The functions of the research management wing are to integrate the research programs undertaken by different academic departments, allocate budget, publish research abstracts, journals annual report, invite Research Management Committee (RMC) funded research project proposals, and evaluate, implement and monitor these projects. 

Some of the Research Journals Publishes by the university is given below:
 Annals of Bangladesh Agriculture (BSMRAU)
 Bangladesh Journal of Entomology (BES/BSMRAU)
 Bangladesh Journal of Plant Breeding and Genetics (BSMRAU)
 Bangladesh Journal of Plant Pathology (BPS/BSMRAU)

Besides the university publishes An Informative Magazine about its various activities called "BSMRAU Barta".

BSMRAU have  developed 44 improved varieties of vegetables,  cereals,  pulses, fruits and flowers which are commercially cultivated by  farmers throughout Bangladesh due to their high yield and nutritional potentials.

World ranking 
As of Spain-based Scimago Institutional Rankings for the Year 2021 BSMRAU Ranks 747th (Overall) & 378th (Research) in the World and 1st in Overall Bangladeshi Universities and Research Institutions.

Faculties and departments

Faculty of Postgraduate Studies

Faculty of Agriculture

Agricultural Extension and Rural Development
Agroforestry and Environment
Agronomy
Agricultural Engineering
Agro-processing
Biochemistry and Molecular Biology
Environmental Science
Biotechnology
Computer Science and Information Technology( CSIT )
Crop Botany
Entomology
Genetics and Plant Breeding
Horticulture
Plant Pathology
Soil Science
Seed Science and Technology Unit

Faculty of Fisheries 

Department of Aquaculture
Fisheries Biology and Aquatic Environment
Fisheries Management
Fisheries Technology
Genetics and Fish Breeding

Faculty of Veterinary Medicine and Animal Science

Department of Anatomy & Histology
Department of Animal breeding & Genetics
Department of Animal science & Nutrition
Department of Dairy & Poultry Science
Department of Gynecology, Obstetrics & Reproductive health
Department of Medicine
Department of Microbiology & Public health
Department of Pathobiology
Department of Physiology & Pharmacology
Department of Surgery & Radiology

Faculty of Agricultural Economics and Rural Development
Department of Agricultural economics
Department of Agribusiness
Department of Agricultural Finance & Cooperatives
Department of Rural development
Department of Statistics

Library
The library of BSMRAU is named as Prof. Dr. Yoshio Yamada Library. It has a separate two-storied building having 14,418 squire feet spaces. It was primarily established for postgraduate programs. However, with the inception of undergraduate programs, efforts are underway to equip the library with all necessary reference text books with multiple copies for all courses of undergraduate programs. It has a collection of around 21,800 books and more than 65,000 e-journals. The library is also regularly supplied with the journals, periodicals, bulletins, daily newspaper, magazines etc. The library is air conditioned with adequate sitting and reading facilities and an Audio-visual Room.

Students dormitories

Boys halls
 Shaheed Ahsanullah Master Hall (SAM Hall)
 Shaheed Tajuddin Ahmed Hall

Girls halls
 Bangamata Sheikh Fazilatunnesa Mujib Hall
 Ila Mitra Hall

Admission

Undergraduate program

A new system of Cluster examination was introduced from the year 2019-2020 for seven public universities of Bangladesh which provide Education in Agricultural science. These are Bangabandhu Sheikh Mujibur Rahman Agricultural University, Bangladesh Agricultural University, Sher-e-Bangla Agricultural University, Chittagong Veterinary and Animal Sciences University, Sylhet Agricultural University, Khulna Agricultural University and Patuakhali Science and Technology University. The cluster system reduced students hardships and financial costs. The admission test is held on each campus but at a time with the same question.

Graduate program
The Faculty of Graduate studies offers MS and PhD degree in specialized disciplines of Agriculture. The Dean, faculty of Graduate Studies as academic executive of the faculty co-ordinates the academic activities of the university at graduate level. The faculty of graduate studies includes of 22 (twenty Two) academic departments, 1(one) academic unit, 1(one) institute and 2 (two) supporting departments. Each academic department/unit/institute has a Board of Studies (BOS) chaired by the head of the respective department/unit/institute. The Dean is assisted by and Additional Registrar for academic matters and Deputy Controller of Examinations for examination issues.

Notable people
 Biotechnology professor Md. Tofazzal Islam won the Bangladesh Academy of Sciences Gold Medal 2011.

See also
 Sheikh Mujibur Rahman
 Sheikh Hasina

References

External links
  ICT Cell, BSMRAU
 University Grants Commission Bangladesh

Public universities of Bangladesh
Educational institutions established in 1998
1998 establishments in Bangladesh
Organisations based in Gazipur
Universities and colleges in Gazipur District
Agricultural universities and colleges in Bangladesh